The 87th Infantry Brigade is a unit of the United States Army which served in the Army Reserve from 1921 to 1941. Part of the New York Army National Guard, it was assigned to the 44th Infantry Division. The 87th Brigade was made up of the 71st and 174th Infantry Regiments.

References 

087
Military units and formations established in 1921
Military units and formations disestablished in 1941